Shaun is a British YouTuber. Video essays by Shaun have covered popular culture and politics, specifically to critique neoliberalism, anti-feminism, and the alt-right.

Career 
Shaun began his current YouTube channel in 2016, and it is primarily funded through Patreon supporters. Shaun has made left-wing videos about the 2017 Unite the Right rally ("Charlottesville: The true Alt-Right"), the scientific racism of the 1994 book The Bell Curve ("The Bell Curve"), the atomic bombings of Hiroshima and Nagasaki ("Dropping the Bomb: Hiroshima & Nagasaki"), politics in video games, Native American history, feminism and white supremacy. He has also created a video series called How PragerU Lies to You, which criticizes and responds to videos created by American conservative think tank PragerU.

His video "Doom: The Fake Outrage" was named by Polygon as one of 2018's best video essays, with Polygon describing him as "quite possibly the most droll human on the internet".

Shaun has been included in an informal group of leftist YouTube essayists sometimes known as "BreadTube" or "LeftTube". This group also often includes Kat Blaque, ContraPoints, Hbomberguy, Lindsay Ellis, and Philosophy Tube.

References

Further reading 
YouTuber Shaun—AKA Skull-Boy—Is the Antidote to "Intellectual" Bigotry  - Feature in Popdust

Year of birth missing (living people)
English YouTubers
Video essayists
English anti-fascists
English-language YouTube channels
English political commentators
English social commentators
English socialist feminists
English communists
Living people
Male feminists
Patreon creators
Commentary YouTubers
British essayists